YHOO may refer to:
Yahoo! (stock symbol)
Hooker Creek Airport (ICAO airport code)